George F. McAulay (October 9, 1879 – March 8, 1941) was an American politician in the state of Washington. He served in the Washington State Senate from 1935 to 1941. From 1937 to 1939, he was president pro tempore of the Senate.

References

Democratic Party Washington (state) state senators
1870 births
1941 deaths